Al-Qūaīrah is one of the districts  of Aqaba governorate, Jordan.

References 

 
Districts of Jordan